John Younie (born March 3, 1950) is a former provincial level politician from Alberta, Canada. He served as a member of the Legislative Assembly of Alberta for a single term from 1986 to 1989 and sat as a member of the New Democrats caucus when they held official opposition status.

Political career
Younie ran for a seat in the Alberta Legislature in the 1979 Alberta general election in the electoral district of Rocky Mountain House. He finished a distant third place out of four candidates behind future Social Credit leader Lavern Ahlstrom and John Murray Campbell who won the district.

He would make another attempt to win a seat by running in the 1986 Alberta general election. He won a hotly contested race in the electoral district of Edmonton-Glengarry by a safe margin defeating four other candidates.

Younie ran for a second term in the 1989 Alberta general election but was defeated in a landslide by Laurence Decore who had become leader of the Liberals the previous year.

References

External links
Legislative Assembly of Alberta Members Listing

Living people
Alberta New Democratic Party MLAs
1950 births